Kristian Pihl Lorentzen (born 19 May 1961 in Silkeborg) is a Danish politician and author, who is a member of the Folketing for the Venstre political party. He was elected into parliament at the 2005 Danish general election.

Political career
Lorentzen sat in the municipal council of Kjellerup Municipality from 1993 to 2006. After 2006 the municipality was merged with Gjern, Silkeborg and  Them, municipalities to form the new Silkeborg Municipality.

Lorentzen was first elected into parliament at the 2005 election and was reelected in 2007. He was elected again in 2011, where he received 9,488	personal votes. In 2015 he was reelected with 7,768 votes and in 2019 with 6,963 votes.

Honours and decorations 
  Order of the Dannebrog, Knight

Bibliography
Stop trafikal egoisme (2020, co-author)
På sporet af Danmark ‒ Jernbanen før, nu og i fremtiden (2013)
Hvor der er vilje, er der vej ‒ Transportpolitiske visioner for Danmark (2010)

References

External links 
 Biography on the website of the Danish Parliament (Folketinget)

1961 births
Living people
People from Silkeborg
Venstre (Denmark) politicians
Danish writers
Danish municipal councillors
Knights of the Order of the Dannebrog
Members of the Folketing 2005–2007
Members of the Folketing 2007–2011
Members of the Folketing 2011–2015
Members of the Folketing 2015–2019
Members of the Folketing 2019–2022